Bretnig-Hauswalde is a former municipality in the district of Bautzen, in Saxony, Germany. It was disbanded on 1 January 2017. The villages Bretnig and Hauswalde became part of the town Großröhrsdorf.

References 

Populated places in Bautzen (district)
Former municipalities in Saxony